HMS L19 was a L-class submarine built for the Royal Navy during World War I. The boat was not completed before the end of the war and was sold for scrap in 1937.

Design and description
L9 and its successors were enlarged to accommodate 21-inch (53.3 cm) torpedoes and more fuel. They displaced  on the surface and  submerged. The L-class submarines had a crew of 38 officers and ratings.

For surface running, the boats were powered by two 12-cylinder Vickers  diesel engines, each driving one propeller shaft. When submerged each propeller was driven by a  electric motor. They could reach  on the surface and  underwater.

The boats were armed with four 21-inch torpedo tubes in the bow and two 18-inch (45 cm) in broadside mounts. They carried four reload torpedoes for the 21-inch tubes for a grand total of ten torpedoes of all sizes. They were also armed with a  deck gun.

Construction and career
HMS L19 was laid down on 18 July 1917 by Vickers at their Barrow-in-Furness shipyard, launched on 4 February 1918, and completed on 2 August 1919. L19 was assigned to the 4th Submarine Flotilla and HMS Titania in 1919 and sailed to Hong Kong, arriving on 14 April 1920. L19 was sold for scrap on 12 April 1937 at Pembroke Dock.

Notes

References
 
 
 
 

 

British L-class submarines
Ships built in Barrow-in-Furness
1919 ships
World War I submarines of the United Kingdom
Royal Navy ship names